Gifford Roux (June 28, 1923 – August 19, 2011) was an American professional basketball player.

A 6'5" forward, Roux attended the University of Kansas but did not play basketball.

Roux played three seasons in the Basketball Association of America (BAA) as a member of the St. Louis Bombers and Providence Steamrollers.

BAA career statistics

Playoffs

References
Obituary

External links

1923 births
2011 deaths
American men's basketball players
Basketball players from Missouri
Forwards (basketball)
People from Alton, Illinois
People from Bonne Terre, Missouri
Providence Steamrollers players
St. Louis Bombers (NBA) players
University of Kansas alumni